Devyn Ariel Tyler is an American actress. She is a regular on the TV series Snowfall and Clarice.

Biography 
Tyler was born in New Orleans to actress Deneen Tyler. She attended the Kinder High School for the Performing and Visual Arts in Houston and graduated from Columbia University in 2013. She has been acting since age eight, landing minor roles in The Curious Case of Benjamin Button and The Great Debaters before taking a break to study French and Francophone studies at Columbia. She returned to acting after college, appearing in TV shows Clarice (2021–present) as well as The Underground Railroad (2021), Fear the Walking Dead (2020), The Purge (2018–2020) and Watchmen (2019). Her movie credits include Deep Water (2022).

Filmography

Film

Television

References 

Living people
Columbia College (New York) alumni
High School for the Performing and Visual Arts alumni
African-American actresses
American actresses
21st-century American actresses
1991 births